Eupithecia recens is a moth in the family Geometridae. It is found in Russia (the South Siberian Mountains) and Kyrghyzstan.

References

Moths described in 1903
recens
Moths of Asia